Richard Middleton FBA is Emeritus Professor of Music at Newcastle University in Newcastle upon Tyne. He is also the founder and co-ordinating editor of the journal Popular Music.

Education
Middleton studied at Clare College, Cambridge and at the University of York, where his PhD was supervised by Wilfrid Mellers.

Career
Middleton previously taught at the University of Birmingham and the Open University. He was appointed to his present position in 1998.

In 2004 Professor Middleton was elected to a Fellowship by the British Academy.

Middleton retired from his post at Newcastle in 2005.

Bibliography

Author
Pop Music and the Blues: A Study of the Relationship and Its Significance. London: Gollancz, 1972. .
Studying Popular Music. Philadelphia: Open University Press, 1990. .
Voicing the Popular: On the Subjects of Popular Music. London: Routledge, 2006. .

Editor or co-editor
Reading Pop. Oxford University Press, 2000. 
Clayton, Martin, Trevor Herbert, and Richard Middleton, eds. The Cultural Study of Music: A Critical Introduction. London: Routledge, 2003.

References

External links

 Prof. Richard Middleton - Profile, background, publications, and other detailed information from the University of Newcastle Arts & Cultures Staff index

English musicologists
Alumni of Clare College, Cambridge
Alumni of the University of York
Academics of the University of Birmingham
Academics of the Open University
Academics of Newcastle University
Fellows of the British Academy
Year of birth missing (living people)
Place of birth missing (living people)
Living people